Ani Choying Drolma (born 4 June 1947

), also known as Choying Dolma and Ani Choying (Ani, "nun", is an honorific), is a Nepalese Buddhist nun of Tibetan origin and musician from the Nagi Gompa nunnery in Nepal. She is known in Nepal and throughout the world for bringing many Tibetan Buddhist chants and feast songs to mainstream audiences. She has been recently appointed as the UNICEF Goodwill Ambassador to Nepal.

Early life
Ani Choying was born on 4 June 1971, in Kathmandu, Nepal, to Tibetan exiles. She entered monastic life as a means of escape from her physically abusive father, and she was accepted into the Nagi Gompa nunnery at the age of 13. For a number of years, the monastery's resident chant master (who was trained directly by the wife of Tulku Urgyen Rinpoche) taught Ani Choying the music that she is famous for performing.

Musical career
In 1994, guitarist Steve Tibbetts visited the nunnery and eventually recorded much of the Tibetan music with Ani Choying on two albums. The recordings, titled Chö and Selwa, were released to critical acclaim. Tibbetts and Ani Choying embarked on small performance tours, which included shows at several historical Tibetan monasteries.

Discography
Chö (1997) (with Steve Tibbetts)
Dancing Dakini (1999)
Choying (2000)
Moments Of Bliss (2004)
Selwa (2004)
Smile (2005)
Taking Refuge (2006)
Inner Peace (2006)
Time (2007)
Aama (2009)
Matakalaa (2010)
Inner Peace 2 (2010)
Mangal Vani (2011)
Clear Light (2012)
 Zariya - Ani, A R Rahman, Farah Siraj—Coke Studio (Season 3) at MTV (2013)
Rebuilding with Love World Tour

Humanitarian work

Ani Choying has been involved in several humanitarian works. She has advocated the need for an official Earth Anthem for the planet supporting the efforts of Indian poet-diplomat Abhay K in this direction. She was part of India Inclusion Summit where she delivered a heart-warming speech.

Book 
She published her autobiographical book Phoolko Aankhama in 2008. The book has been translated into 14 different languages.

References

External links
Official website
NPR: Buddhist Nun Shares the Sound of Music

1971 births
Living people
Tibetan-language singers
Tibetan Buddhists from Nepal
People from Kathmandu
Nepalese people of Tibetan descent
Performers of Buddhist music
21st-century Nepalese women singers
Nepalese Buddhist nuns
20th-century Buddhist nuns
21st-century Buddhist nuns
Six Degrees Records artists
21st-century Tibetan women singers